is a Japanese football player. He plays for Roasso Kumamoto.

Career
Takuya Wakasugi joined LB-BRB Tokyo in 2016. In July, he moved to J2 League club Roasso Kumamoto.

References

External links

1993 births
Living people
University of Tsukuba alumni
Association football people from Kumamoto Prefecture
Japanese footballers
J2 League players
Roasso Kumamoto players
Association football forwards